Glamour Girls may refer to:
 Glamour Girls (1994 film), a Nigerian film
 Glamour Girls (2022 film), a Nigerian film

See also
 The Glamour Girls, a female professional wrestling tag team